Voronizh is an urban-type settlement in Shostka Raion of Sumy Oblast in Ukraine. It is located on the banks of the Osota, a left tributary of the Desna, in the drainage basin of the Dnieper. Voronizh belongs to Shostka urban hromada, one of the hromadas of Ukraine. Population:

Economy

Industry
A sugar factory in Voronizh was built in the 1860s by Nikolay Tereshchenko. It was the largest industrial enterprise in the settlement until 2004, when it stopped operation.

Transportation
Tereshchenska railway station is located in Voronizh. It is on the main line connecting Kyiv and Moscow across the Russian border; there is also a side line to Shostka and Novhorod-Siverskyi which starts in Tereshchenska. There is intensive passenger traffic through the station. Until 2007, it was known as Voronezhska railway station.

The settlement is connected by road with Shostka and with Krolevets, where it has access to Highway M02 and further to Kyiv.

References

Urban-type settlements in Shostka Raion
Glukhovsky Uyezd